was a Fudai feudal domain under the Tokugawa shogunate of  Edo period Japan.  It was located in southeastern Ōmi Province, in the Kansai region of central Honshu. The domain was centered at Yamakami jin'ya, located in what is now the Yamakami neighborhood of the city of Higashiōmi in Shiga Prefecture.

History
Yamakami was located in a strategically important location on a road connecting Ōmi with Ise Province and the area was hotly contested by various warlords in the Sengoku period. Yamakami Domain was created for Inagaki Shigetada, a hatamoto in the service of Shogun Tokugawa Ietsuna who rose through the ranks of the Shogunate bureaucracy, including serving as a wakadoshiyori. He gained additional fiefs with his promotions, eventually meeting the required kokudaka to be allowed to establish a cadet branch of the Inagaki clan. Inagaki Shigetada constructed a jin'ya and jōkamachi, but the domain's financial situation became critical during the time of the 3rd daimyō, Inagaki Sadayoshi, when both of the domain's Edo residences burned down in a fire. Fiscal reforms ended in failure, and under his successors the domain's situation went from bad to worse with repeated crop failures and the Great Tenmei famine. Appointments to the posts of Osaka kaban and Sōshaban within the shogunal administration were also a serious drain on resources. 

During the Bakumatsu period, the 8th daimyō, Inagaki Motokiyo, served as Ōbangashira and Kaigun Bugyō and was a staunch supporter of the Shogunate. However, when he fell ill and was replaced by Inagaki Motoyoshi at the start of the Boshin War, the domain quickly changed sides to the imperial cause. As with all domains, Yamakami Domain was abolished in 1870 with the abolition of the han system. It subsequently was incorporated into Ōtsu prefecture, and then Shiga Prefecture.

Bakumatsu period holdings
As with most domains in the han system, Yamakami Domain consisted of a discontinuous territories calculated to provide the assigned kokudaka, based on periodic cadastral surveys and projected agricultural yields.

Ōmi Province
5 villages in Yasu District
9 villages in Kōka District
4 villages in Gamō District
8 villages in  Kanzaki District
1 village in  Sakata District
1 village in  Azai District

List of daimyō

  Inagaki clan (Fudai) 1698-1871

See also
List of Han

References
The content of this article was largely derived from that of the corresponding article on Japanese Wikipedia.

*

Notes

Domains of Japan
1690s establishments in Japan
History of Shiga Prefecture
Ōmi Province
Ōmihachiman, Shiga